The Curuá River is a river of Pará state in north-central Brazil.

The river basin lies partly within the  Grão-Pará Ecological Station, the largest fully protected tropical forest conservation unit on the planet.
Part of the river's basin is in the Maicuru Biological Reserve.
The river is also fed by streams in the  Mulata National Forest, a sustainable use conservation unit created in 2001.

See also
List of rivers of Pará

References

Brazilian Ministry of Transport

Rivers of Pará
Tributaries of the Amazon River